Sir Alfred Woodley Croft  (7 February 1841 – 29 October 1925) was a British educationist and administrator who spent most of his career in India. From 1877 until his retirement in 1897 he was Director of Public Instruction in Bengal, and was appointed a Companion of the Order of the Indian Empire (CIE) in November 1884.

Born in Compton Gifford, he was the son of Charles and Charlotte Croft. He was educated at the Mannamead School. He graduated BA in philosophy from the Exeter College, Oxford in 1863 and an MA in 1871. He went to Calcutta to join the Bengal Education Service in 1866 as a professor of philosophy to Presidency College, then under the University of Calcutta.

Previously Croft was appointed a Companion of the Order of the Indian Empire in 1887 he was raised to a knighthood as a Knight Commander of the order and was described as a Director of Public Instruction for Bengal.

He served as the vice chancellor of the University of Calcutta from 1893 to 1896. In 1897, the University awarded him with an honorary doctorate degree on the occasion of his retirement.

He was also a member of the Bengal Legislative Council from 1887 to 1892.

Croft returned to England and never married, he died in Tavistock on 29 October 1925.

References

External links

1841 births
1925 deaths
Alumni of Exeter College, Oxford
People educated at Plymouth College
Vice Chancellors of the University of Calcutta
Knights Commander of the Order of the Indian Empire
Presidents of The Asiatic Society